José Condungua Pacheco (born 1958 in Sofala Province) is a Mozambican politician who has been the Minister of Foreign Affairs for Mozambique until 2019. He previously served as minister of Agriculture from 2010 to 2017; Minister of the interior from 2005 to 2009. Pacheco was governor of Cabo Delgado Province from 1998 to 2005 and vice minister of agriculture from 1995 to 1998. He is a certified agricultural technology engineer.

References

Living people
Agriculture ministers of Mozambique
Foreign ministers of Mozambique
Interior ministers of Mozambique
Recipients of the Eduardo Mondlane Order
1958 births